The Robert Mouawad Private Museum is a private residence in Beirut's Zokak el-Blat quarter that was turned into a museum by the Lebanese businessman Robert Mouawad.

The palace was built in the neo-gothic style by the Lebanese politician and art collector Henri Philippe Pharaoun in 1891. The museum was inaugurated on 11 May 2006. It houses objects of value reflecting a mix of artistic oriental and occidental cultures, and a collection of rare books, Chinese porcelain, ceramics, and other significant objects. The palace's architecture and design reflects Pharaoun's infatuation with Islamic Art and decorative wooden panels that date back to the 17th century, especially after his repeated travels to Syria. Other displayed artifacts include Byzantine mosaics, Roman marble sculptures, jars and jugs, historical columns, pottery, ancient weapons, unique carpets, jewelry pieces, precious stones, Melkite Catholic icons, and preserved manuscripts.

References

2006 establishments in Lebanon
Buildings and structures completed in 1891
Museums established in 2006
Museums in Beirut
Archaeological museums in Lebanon
Mouwad, Robert
Historic house museums in Asia
Palaces in Lebanon